The Liechtenstein Employees' Association (LANV) is the only trade union in Liechtenstein. It was founded in 1920 and is affiliated with the International Trade Union Confederation.

References

Trade unions in Liechtenstein
International Trade Union Confederation
Trade unions established in 1920